Ride on Time is the fifth studio album by Japanese singer-songwriter Tatsuro Yamashita, released by AIR/RVC on September 19, 1980. It is best known for its title track, which was used in the television commercial for Maxell cassette tapes starring Yamashita, and released as a single in May 1980. The song became his first charting single, peaking at No. 3 on Oricon's weekly singles chart with sales of 417,000 copies. In 2003, the song was featured on the television drama Good Luck!! starring Takuya Kimura, and entered the top 20 on the chart again.

The album was released after the title track became a hit, and gained commercial success subsequently. It topped the Oricon weekly albums chart for a week in October 1980, selling more than 220,000 units.

Following the album's release, the song "My Sugar Babe" (ode to the band he formerly fronted) was issued as a single. It was featured as a theme song for the television drama Keishi-K starring and directed by Shintaro Katsu and aired on NTV in Autumn 1980. Yamashita composed the entire background music used on the TV series. The album's 2002 remastered edition includes three tracks from the soundtrack as bonus tracks.

Track listing

Personnel

Someday
Tatsuro Yamashita – Electric Guitar (Right), Glocken, Percussion & Background Vocals
Jun Aoyama – Drums
Koki Ito – Bass
Kazuo Shiina – Electric Guitar (Left) & Guitar Synthesizer
Hiroyuki Namba – Keyboards
Minako Yoshida – Background Vocals
Shin Kazuhara – Trumpet
Yoshihiro Nakagawa – Trumpet
Shigeharu Mukai – Trombone
Tadanori Konakawa – Trombone
Takeru Muraoka – Tenor Sax
Shunzo Sunahara – Baritone Sax

Daydream
Tatsuro Yamashita – Electric Guitar (Right), Percussion & Background Vocals
Jun Aoyama – Drums
Koki Ito – Bass
Kazuo Shiina – Electric Guitar (Left)
Hiroyuki Namba – Keyboards
Nobu Saito – Percussion
Shin Kazuhara – Trumpet
Yoshihiro Nakagawa – Trumpet
Shigeharu Mukai – Trombone
Tadanori Konakawa – Trombone
Takeru Muraoka – Tenor Sax
Shunzo Sunahara – Baritone Sax

Silent Screamer
Tatsuro Yamashita – Electric Guitar (Right), Percussion & Background Vocals
Jun Aoyama – Drums
Koki Ito – Bass
Kazuo Shiina – Electric Guitar (Left)
Hiroyuki Namba – Keyboards
Nobu Saito – Percussion
Minako Yoshida – Background Vocals

Ride on Time
Tatsuro Yamashita – Electric Guitar (Right), Percussion & Background Vocals
Jun Aoyama – Drums
Koki Ito – Bass
Kazuo Shiina – Electric Guitar (Left)
Hiroyuki Namba – Keyboards
Hidefumi Toki – Alto Sax Solo
Minako Yoshida – Background Vocals
Shin Kazuhara – Trumpet
Yoshihiro Nakagawa – Trumpet
Shigeharu Mukai – Trombone
Tadanori Konakawa – Trombone
Takeru Muraoka – Tenor Sax
Shunzo Sunahara – Baritone Sax

The Door into Summer
Tatsuro Yamashita – Electric Guitar (Right), Clavinet, Percussion & Background Vocals
Jun Aoyama – Drums
Koki Ito – Bass
Kazuo Shiina – Electric Guitar (Left)
Hiroyuki Namba – Keyboards
Kenji Nakazawa – Flugelhorn Solo
Minako Yoshida – Background Vocals

My Sugar Babe
Tatsuro Yamashita – Electric Guitar (Right), Glocken & Background Vocals
Jun Aoyama – Drums
Koki Ito – Bass
Kazuo Shiina – Electric Guitar (Left)
Toshiaki Usui – Acoustic Guitar
Hiroyuki Namba – Keyboards
Nobu Saito – Percussion

Rainy Day
Tatsuro Yamashita – Electric Guitar (Right), Electric Sitar, Percussion & Background Vocals
Jun Aoyama – Drums
Koki Ito – Bass
Kazuo Shiina – Electric Guitar (Left)
Hiroshi Sato – Keyboards

Clouds
Tatsuro Yamashita – Electric Guitar (Right), Korg Lambda Strings, Percussion & Background Vocals
Jun Aoyama – Drums
Koki Ito – Bass
Kazuo Shiina – Electric Guitar (Left)
Hiroshi Sato – Keyboards
Nobu Saito – Percussion
Hidefumi Toki – Alto Sax

Kissing Goodnight
Tatsuro Yamashita – Acoustic Piano, Minimoog & Background Vocals
Hiroyuki Namba – Korg PS-3100 Synthesizer

Ride on Time [Single version]
Tatsuro Yamashita Electric Guitar (Right), Kalimba, Percussion & Background Vocals
Jun Aoyama – Drums
Koki Ito – Bass
Kazuo Shiina – Electric Guitar (Left)
Hiroyuki Namba – Keyboards
Hidefumi Toki – Alto Sax Solo
Minako Yoshida – Background Vocals
Shin Kazuhara – Trumpet
Yoshikazu Kishi – Trumpet
Shigeharu Mukai – Trombone
Tadanori Konakawa – Trombone
Takeru Muraoka – Tenor Sax
Shunzo Sunahara – Baritone Sax

Interlude I & II
Tatsuro Yamashita – Electric Guitar (Right)
Jun Aoyama – Drums
Koki Ito – Bass
Kazuo Shiina – Electric Guitar (Left)
Hiroyuki Namba – Keyboards

My Sugar Babe [Instrumental]
Tatsuro Yamashita – Electric Guitar (Left)
Jun Aoyama – Drums
Koki Ito – Bass
Kazuo Shiina – Electric Guitar (Right)
Hiroyuki Namba – Keyboards

Chart positions

Weekly charts

Year-end charts

Release history

References

External links
 
 

1980 albums
Tatsuro Yamashita albums